Tomer Swisa is an Israeli footballer currently playing for Hapoel Beit She'an.

Honours
Toto Cup Al
2010–11
Toto Cup Leumit
2009–10
Liga Leumit
2009–10

References

1988 births
Living people
Israeli footballers
Hapoel Ironi Kiryat Shmona F.C. players
Hapoel Nir Ramat HaSharon F.C. players
Hapoel Be'er Sheva F.C. players
Beitar Jerusalem F.C. players
Hapoel Haifa F.C. players
Hapoel Ashkelon F.C. players
Hapoel Ra'anana A.F.C. players
Hapoel Afula F.C. players
Hapoel Nof HaGalil F.C. players
F.C. Daburiyya players
Hapoel Migdal HaEmek F.C. players
Hapoel Beit She'an F.C. players
Liga Leumit players
Israeli Premier League players
Israeli people of Moroccan-Jewish descent
Footballers from Beit She'an
Association football forwards